Jane Maria Read (October 4, 1853 – ?) was an American poet and teacher.

Early life and education
Jane Maria Read was born in Barnstable, Massachusetts, October 4, 1853. She was the daughter of William and Susan Maritta (Austin) Read. Her father, Rev. Read, was a Baptist clergyman. She came from old colonial families on both sides, and her ancestors were among the early English pioneers. Until six years of age, her home was in Massachusetts. In 1859, her parents moved to the seacoast of Maine, where they lived till 1865, at that time returning to Massachusetts.

Her literary taste began early to be developed in her home, where she was wont to listen absorbed to the reading of history, travels, and The Poetical Works Of Sir Walter Scott, when too young to enjoy reading them alone. During her school life, and subsequently, her love of poetry increased year by year. She studied at Newell's Private School, Wilbraham, Massachusetts; Burnett's English Classical Institute, Springfield, Waterville, Maine;  and in the Coburn Classical Institute, in Waterville, Maine, for several years, though ill health compelled her to leave during the last year of her course, without graduating. Her classical instruction included art under Childe Hassam, John Joseph Enneking, Emil Carlsen, and others.

Career
Read began to publish her poems in 1874, in various magazines and newspapers, and in 1887, she published a volume of verse entitled Between the Centuries, and Other Poems. She contributed, among others, to the Magazine of Poetry. Besides her poetical work, she was an artist of marked talent, and made a specialty of portraits and animal pictures in oil colors.

She taught languages, mathematics and other branches until about 1885. She also taught drawing, painting and sketching from nature in various towns of Massachusetts for fifteen years.

Personal life
Read was a Baptist, and a woman of broad views, liberal culture and versatility. Her home was in Coldbrook Springs, Massachusetts, where her father was in charge of a church. Later, she resided in Still River, Massachusetts.

Style and themes
Much of Read's poetry was of the introspective kind, with a strong element of the religious and the sentimental. Having been presented with a copy of Henry Wadsworth Longfellow's poems, for months, it was her constant companion, the more so because the state of her health prevented her from mingling with others outside of her home. Many of the poems she read and re-read until she could easily repeat them, and all became quite familiar. This she accepted as a great truth, and in her writing, Read looked within her own heart for the lessons reflected there from nature. A close and sympathetic observer of nature, almost every phase of it had a voice for her. Brought up in a family where she was forced to see the burdens of others, she also wrote for "burden-bearers", and sought to show the brighter side to those whose lives had difficulties. Thus, many of her poems were included the calmness of her own Christian faith.

Selected works
 Between the centuries and other poems, 1887

References

Attribution

External links
 
 

1853 births
19th-century American painters
19th-century American poets
19th-century American women writers
19th-century American educators
19th-century American women artists
19th-century American women educators
People from Barnstable, Massachusetts
Writers from Massachusetts
Painters from Massachusetts
American women painters
American women poets
Educators from Massachusetts
Year of death unknown
Wikipedia articles incorporating text from A Woman of the Century